The Taurida Governorate (modern spelling , ; , ;) or the Government of Taurida, was a historical governorate of the Russian Empire. It included the Crimean Peninsula and the mainland between the lower Dnieper River and the coasts of the Black Sea and Sea of Azov. It was formed after the Taurida Oblast was abolished in 1802 in the course of Paul I's administrative reform of the territories of the former Crimean Khanate that was annexed by the Russian Empire in 1783. The governorate's centre was the city of Simferopol. The province was named after the ancient Greek name of Crimea - Taurida.

Today the territory of the governorate is part of the AR Crimea, Kherson, and Zaporizhzhia regions of Ukraine.

Administrative divisions
The governorate comprised three counties (uyezds) on the mainland:
 Berdyansky Uyezd, centred in Berdyansk
 Dneprovsky Uyezd, Oleshky
 Melitopolsky Uyezd, Melitopol

and five counties plus two city authorities (gradonachalstvo) on the peninsula:
 Yevpatoriysky Uyezd, Yevpatoria
 Perekopsky Uyezd, Perekop
 Simferopolsky Uyezd, Simferopol
 Feodosiysky Uyezd, Feodosiya
 Yaltinsky Uyezd, Yalta
 City of Kerch, Yeni-Kale fortress
 City of Sevastopol

Before 1820 the governorate consisted of seven counties, including  Tmutarakan county on the Taman Peninsula on the eastern side of the Kerch Strait. The Yalta and Berdyansk counties formed later. From 1804 to 1829 there also existed the gradonachalstvo of Feodosiya; and in 1914 Yalta county became the gradonachalstvo of Yalta.

In December 1917 the governorate split, with most of its peninsular part forming the Crimean People's Republic (1917-1918), while the rest remained in undefined position including the city of Sevastopol which remained the main naval base of the Black Sea Fleet of the Russian Republic. The mainland counties were declared part of the Ukrainian People's Republic, yet remained under effective of jurisdiction of the Taurida Governorate.

On  the Third Universal of the Tsentralna Rada of the Ukrainian People's Republic proclaimed the territory of the Ukrainian Republic as comprising: Volyn Governorate, Kiev Governorate, Podolia Governorate, Chernigov Governorate, Poltava Governorate, Kharkov Governorate, Yekaterinoslav Governorate, Kherson Governorate and Taurida Governorate (not including Crimea).

After occupation of Ukraine by Bolsheviks during the Ukrainian–Soviet War, the Taurida Governorate became finally split between Russian soviet republics of the Donetsk-Krivoi Rog Soviet Republic and Taurida Socialist Republic of Soviets.

Geography
The governorate bordered Yekaterinoslav Governorate and Kherson Governorate to its north. The Strait of Kerch bordered the Free lands of the Don Cossacks. It has natural borders, being surrounded by the waters of the Black Sea and the Sea of Azov.

The mainland and the peninsular parts of the region differ significantly.
The population of the whole region was 1,634,700 in 1906. At that time, the mainland part of the governorate was mostly populated by Ukrainians and Russians but had significant ethnic minorities of Germans, Bulgarians, Armenians and Jews, while major ethnic groups of the Crimean peninsula were Crimean Tatars and Russians with German, Greek, Poles, Armenian, and Karaim minorities. Major urban centres were Simferopol, Sevastopol, Theodosia, Bakhchisaray, and Yalta in Crimea, and Aleshki, Berdyansk, and Melitopol on the mainland.

Language

The Imperial census of 1897 found that the population of the governorate consisted of 1,447,790, with 762,804 male and 684,986 female.
 

In 1897 289,316 people lived in the cities, constituting 19.98% of the total population. The ethnicities of the urban population were Russians (49.1%), Tatars (17.16%), and Jews (11.84%), with only 31 people living in cities who chose not to disclose their identity.

Religion
By the Imperial census of 1897 there were around 1,100,000 Eastern Orthodox followers, just over 30,000 Catholic, around 70,000 Protestant Christians and about the same number of Judaic followers. Only 13% of population were Muslims (known in the Russian Empire as Magometians) who mainly lived in the peninsular portion of the guberniya, Crimea itself. They were the main force that after the next 10 years established the first Muslim democratic state of the Crimean People's Republic. Beside the Magometians and Jews there were only eight (8) other non-Christian followers in the whole guberniya (not necessarily Atheists).

History

In 1783, the Khanate of Crimea was annexed by Catherine the Great’s Russia. Soon after this the Taurida Oblast was established. During the reign of Paul I the oblast was abolished, but soon (in 1802) re-established as a governorate (guberniya). It was a part of the Russian Empire until the Russian Revolution of 1918.

Following the 1917 October Revolution, the ethnic Tatar government proclaimed the Crimean People's Republic on December 13, 1917, which was the first Muslim Democratic state. The Tatar republic covered the peninsular portion of the former governorate, while its northern counties ended up temporarily under jurisdiction of the Yekaterinoslav Governorate. However neither Ukraine nor the Crimea managed to hold on to their territories and were overrun by Bolshevik Red Guards in the winter of 1917-18. Briefly in early 1918 the bolsheviks split the governorate territories between the Taurida Soviet Socialist Republic and the Donetsk-Krivoi Rog Soviet Republic before being overrun by the forces of the Ukrainian People's Republic with military assistance from the German Empire.

Notes

References

Further reading

External links
Map of Taurida (1882)

 
Governorates of Ukraine
Governorates of the Russian Empire
Crimea in the Russian Empire
States and territories established in 1802
1802 establishments in the Russian Empire